Normandy High School is a public high school located in Wellston, St. Louis County, Missouri that is part of the Normandy Schools Collaborative.

History
Normandy started a high school at Lincoln Elementary School in Pagedale early its history but it did not last beyond a year. In 1907 a high school was started in the former Washington Elementary School on St. Charles Rock Road, but only one class graduated when the school closed in 1911. In 1923, the district again opened a school, this time on property purchased from the Eden Theological Seminary. For its first year, the high school shared the ornate four-story main building with Eden students. Plans by William B. Ittner for a California-style collegiate campus with a central quadrangle were implemented shortly after. The school opened as a combined junior high school and senior high school, with six levels from 7th through 12th grades. Plans also called for adding the first two years of college. This plan was realized in a way forty years later with the opening of the Normandy Residence Center, which became the University of Missouri-St. Louis. A vocational building and gymnasium, also designed by Ittner, were added in 1929. The vocational building remains as West Hall. The gymnasium, with curved, amphitheater-style seating, was renowned in the area for its architecture.

The founders of the high school had the goal of creating the "ideal high school". The founders embraced an educational concept called "functional education," which meant educating young people to assume their place in the democracy as intelligent, educated, civically involved, ethical people. The curriculum was based on life skills; for example, gaining a lifetime liking for reading, a lifetime passion for learning. Classroom teaching was largely modeled on John Dewey's beliefs in learning by doing and relating the school to the community outside the school and, furthermore, making the school the center of the community. Lectures and tests based on student feeding the lectures back to the teacher were bypassed for hands-on projects, panel discussions, research projects and experiences outside the school. Normandy High was a so-called "lighthouse" school, with its programs the subject of numerous articles in The School Review and other educators' publications and of panels at high-profile places such as the University of Chicago.

Several changes to the original layout of the school were made during the 1940s and 1950s. The Garage, erected in the 1940s with a bus garage below and classrooms above, remains as North Hall. The school opened one of the first St. Louis County high school pools in 1948. Due to large enrollment, a separate junior high school was planned and built in 1949; however, a fire damaged the original junior high school building that year, and while construction was ongoing on the new building, classes were held in two sessions a day. Prior to the 1950s, the campus also included a large lake and forest area, and the school retained faculty residences inherited from Eden in which the Normandy School District superintendent and some teachers lived. The original seminary building was replaced by Central Hall in 1959; the large, Ittner-designed gymnasium was demolished and replaced by the circular Viking Hall.

Community
The school serves 24 separate municipalities in St. Louis County including unincorporated areas. The district encompasses an economically depressed region of St. Louis County including industrial areas such as iron works and scrapyards. The municipalities served are:

 Bellerive
 Bel-Nor
 Bel-Ridge
 Beverly Hills
 Charlack
 Cool Valley
 Glen Echo Park
 Greendale
 Hanley Hills
 Hillsdale
 Normandy
 Northwoods
 Norwood Court
 Pagedale
 Pasadena Hills
 Pasadena Park
 Pine Lawn
 St. John
 Uplands Park
 Velda City
 Velda Village
 Vinita Park
 Vinita Terrace
 Wellston

Activities
For the 2013–2014 school year, the school offered 17 activities approved by the Missouri State High School Activities Association (MSHSAA): baseball, boys and girls basketball, sideline cheerleading, boys and girls cross country, dance team, 11-man football, music activities, girls soccer, softball, speech and debate, girls swimming and diving, boys and girls track and field, girls volleyball, and wrestling. In addition to its current activities, Normandy students have won several state championships, including:
Baseball: 1953
Boys basketball: 1951
Boys golf: 1936, 1949, 1950, 1957
Boys soccer: 1974
Boys swimming and diving: 1952, 1954
Boys track and field: 1974
Girls track and field: 1986
Wrestling: 1937, 1938, 1939, 1940

Notable alumni

Dean Baker, college football player and sports executive
Michael Brown, shot by police in 2014, led to Ferguson unrest
Carl Daniels, Professional boxer
Wayne Goode, Missouri state legislator
Laurence Maroney, National Football League player
Tony Pearson, Mr. World and AAU Mr. Universe body building contestant
Steve Pecher, professional soccer player
DJ TAB, DJ, music producer
Robert A. Young, U.S. Representative Missouri

References

William B. Ittner buildings
Educational institutions established in 1923
High schools in St. Louis County, Missouri
Public high schools in Missouri
1923 establishments in Missouri
Buildings and structures in St. Louis County, Missouri